Euidotea durvillei, known commonly as the red seaweed isopod, is a species of marine isopod found in New Zealand.

Description 
Adults reach  in length. Body is red with a lightly coloured stripe down its back. The leading edge of each segment on the exoskeleton is curved towards its head. The tail section curves outwards.

Habitat 
Euidotea durvillei is found on red seaweeds in the low to shallow subtidal regions of the intertidal zone of rocky shores.

Behaviour & diet 
The red seaweed isopod is a nocturnal grazer feeder, feeding on red seaweed. It camouflages itself against the red seaweed on which it also lives.

References 

Valvifera
Marine crustaceans of New Zealand
Endemic fauna of New Zealand
Crustaceans described in 1993